Ras-related protein Rab-3D is a protein that in humans is encoded by the RAB3D gene.

References

Further reading